Stepan Nikolaevich Bogomyagkov (31 December 1890 – September 1966) was a Soviet komkor (corps commander). He fought in the Imperial Russian Army in World War I before going over to the Bolsheviks in the subsequent civil war. He was promoted to Komkor on 11 November 1935. During the Great Purge, he was arrested in February 1938. Unlike many of his colleagues, he was not executed. In 1941, he was sentenced to 10 years in a labor camp. He was released in 1948 after seven years and lived in retirement in his home region of Perm Oblast. He was not reinstated in the army but did receive a pension.

References

Bibliography

Sources
Репрессии в Красной Армии

1890 births
1966 deaths
Soviet komkors
Recipients of the Order of the Red Banner
Russian military personnel of World War I
Soviet military personnel of the Russian Civil War